The Beckoning Lady is a crime novel by Margery Allingham, first published in 1955 in the United Kingdom by Chatto & Windus, London; and in the United States by Doubleday, New York under the title The Estate of the Beckoning Lady. It is the 15th novel in the Albert Campion series.

Plot introduction
Campion’s glorious summer in Pontisbright is blighted by death. Amidst the preparations for Minnie and Tonker Cassand’s fabulous summer party a murder is discovered and it falls to Campion to unravel the intricate web of motive, suspicion and deduction with all his imagination and skill.

References 
 Margery Allingham, The Beckoning Lady, (London: Chatto & Windus, 1955)
 Margery Allingham, The Beckoning Lady, (Vintage, Random House, 2007)

External links 
An Allingham bibliography, with dates and publishers, from the UK Margery Allingham Society
 A page about the book from the Margery Allingham Archive on archive.org
 A 2011 podcast about The Beckoning Lady

1955 British novels
Novels by Margery Allingham
Chatto & Windus books